The Norwegian Labour and Welfare Administration (NAV, originally an abbreviation of Nye arbeids- og velferdsetaten) is the current Norwegian public welfare agency, which consists of the state Labour and Welfare Service as well as municipal welfare agencies. It is responsible for a third of the state budget of Norway, administering programs such as unemployment benefits, pensions, child benefits and more. The agency has 19,000 employees (14,000 in the state service). Its head is the Labour and Welfare Director, currently Hans Christian Holte, who is appointed by the government.

History
NAV was established as a result of the Norwegian Labour and Welfare Act of 2006. The newly established agency is a collaboration between the Norwegian Labour and Welfare Service and certain parts of the municipal social services. "NAV" was originally an acronym for "New Labour and Welfare Administration" but is now seen as a word.

The aim of the NAV reform is to gather all the social security and employment offices to a common state agency where the employees of the Labour and Welfare Service and the municipal social services would work together to find solutions for unemployed people. The reform was adopted by the Parliament of Norway in the spring of 2005, and the social security agency National Insurance Service and employment agency Aetat was formally dismantled in July 2006 as the new Labour and Welfare Agency was established.

The agency's name as a verb
Media have reported the existence of the verb "nave", which can be defined as a person taking a one-year holiday from one's (process of acquisition of) formal education, while expecting that the agency will pay for the holiday. The word was named Word of the year in Norway in 2012 by the Language Council of Norway.

References

External links
 Official website

Government agencies of Norway
Government agencies established in 2006